The Kaiwera Downs Wind Farm is a wind farm under construction in the Southland region of New Zealand. It is consented to have a maximum capacity of 240MW and use up 83 turbines. Originally proposed by Trustpower, it will now be owned and operated by Mercury Energy. The 10 turbine, 43MW stage 1 of the project is under construction.

The New Zealand Ministry for Culture and Heritage gives a translation of "hot food" for Kaiwera.

Location

Construction
The project received resource consent in June 2008. In September 2018 Tilt said that the development was waiting for favourable market conditions. In June 2021 Tilt announced the project was being acquired by Mercury Energy. In June 2022 Mercury began talks with the local community over the wind farm.

Installation of an initial ten turbines totalling 43MW of generation is expected to start in October 2022. Earthworks began in the first week of October 2022. A sod-turning ceremony was held in November 2022, with the first turbines expected to arrive in April 2023.  As of February 2023, Mercury say they expect all turbines to be operational by October 2023

Transmission 

Power is being exported to the New Zealand grid via a new 18km, 33kV, monopole, overhead transmission line to the Gore Substation.

See also

Wind power in New Zealand

References

External links

Proposed wind farms in New Zealand
Buildings and structures in Southland, New Zealand